Sergey Anatolyevich Nazin (born 16 July 1987) is a Russian diver.

He participated at the 2019 World Aquatics Championships, winning a medal.

References

External links

1987 births
Living people
Russian male divers
People from Buzuluk, Orenburg Oblast
World Aquatics Championships medalists in diving
Universiade medalists in diving
Universiade silver medalists for Russia
Medalists at the 2013 Summer Universiade
Medalists at the 2009 Summer Universiade
Sportspeople from Orenburg Oblast